Local government in Ireland may refer to:

 Local government in the Republic of Ireland
 Local government in Northern Ireland
 History of local government in Ireland, includes period before partition between Northern Ireland and Republic of Ireland